Songs of Kristofferson is a best-of compilation album by Kris Kristofferson, released in 1977, after he had become more well known as a movie star than as a singer-songwriter.  It includes tracks from his albums Kristofferson, The Silver Tongued Devil and I, Jesus Was a Capricorn, Who's to Bless and Who's to Blame and Surreal Thing. The album was re-released on CD in 1990.

The original LP sleeve featured liner notes by longtime Village Voice critic Nat Hentoff.

Track listing
All songs by Kris Kristofferson except as indicated.

Side one
"The Silver-Tongued Devil" 
"Loving Her Was Easier (than Anything I'll Ever Do Again)" 
"Me and Bobby McGee" (Kristofferson, Fred Foster)
"Help Me Make It Through the Night" 
"For the Good Times" 
"Sunday Morning Comin' Down"

Side two
"You Show Me Yours (and I'll Show You Mine)" 
"The Pilgrim: Chapter 33 (Hang In, Hopper)"
"Stranger" 
"I Got a Life of My Own"
"Why Me"
"Who's to Bless and Who's to Blame"

Charts

Certifications and sales

References 

Songs of Kristofferson
Albums produced by Fred Foster
Songs of Kristofferson
Monument Records compilation albums
Albums produced by David Anderle